Anton Rokhusovich Shokh (born 5 January 1960 in Dzhambul, now Taraz; died 7 March 2009 in Oskemen) was a Kazakhstani professional football player and coach.

He also held Russian citizenship. He made his professional debut in the Soviet Top League in 1979 for FC Kairat.

Honours
 Soviet Top League champion: 1988.
 Soviet Top League runner-up: 1987, 1989.
 Soviet Cup winner: 1989.
 USSR Federation Cup winner: 1986, 1989.
 USSR Super Cup winner: 1989.

European club competitions
With FC Dnipro Dnipropetrovsk

 1986–87 UEFA Cup: 2 games.
 1988–89 UEFA Cup: 2 games.
 1989–90 European Cup: 1 game.

References

1960 births
2009 deaths
People from Taraz
Soviet footballers
Kazakhstani footballers
Kazakhstani football managers
Kazakhstani expatriate footballers
Soviet Top League players
Veikkausliiga players
Ukrainian Premier League players
FC Kairat players
FC Dnipro players
LASK players
FC Metalurh Zaporizhzhia players
Hapoel Tzafririm Holon F.C. players
FC Rotor Volgograd players
FC Kremin Kremenchuk players
Rovaniemen Palloseura players
MFC Mykolaiv players
FC Nyva Ternopil players
Expatriate footballers in Ukraine
Expatriate footballers in Austria
Expatriate footballers in Israel
Expatriate footballers in Finland
FC Sodovik Sterlitamak managers
Soviet expatriate sportspeople in Austria
Soviet expatriate sportspeople in Israel
Kazakhstani expatriate sportspeople in Finland
Kazakhstani expatriate sportspeople in Ukraine
Kazakhstani expatriate sportspeople in Russia
Kazakhstani expatriate sportspeople in Uzbekistan
Expatriate football managers in Ukraine
Expatriate football managers in Russia
Expatriate football managers in Uzbekistan
Association football midfielders
FC Vorskla Poltava players
FC Lada-Tolyatti players